The 2018 National Football League, known for sponsorship reasons as the Allianz National Football League, was the 87th staging of the National Football League (NFL), an annual Gaelic football tournament for Gaelic Athletic Association county teams. Thirty-one county teams from the island of Ireland, plus London, compete. Kilkenny do not participate.

The first six rounds in all four divisions were scheduled to have been played before 24 March 2018, allowing the final round seven matches to be played on that date. Due to poor winter weather, some fixtures in Division 2 (round 6) and Division 4 (rounds 5 and 6) had not been played by that date. The GAA decided to proceed with the final round seven matches in the four divisions before the completion of the earlier rounds. This decision proved controversial - for instance, in the rescheduled Division 2 match between Louth and Meath which was played on 31 March 2018, Meath needed to win to avoid relegation while Louth had nothing to play for as they were already relegated irrespective of the result. Meath beat Louth by 1-12 to 0-07, thereby ensuring that Down were relegated.

Eir Sport and TG4 provide live TV coverage of the league on Saturday nights and Sunday afternoons respectively. The highlights programmes are RTÉ2's League Sunday on Sunday evenings and TG4's GAA 2018 on Monday evenings.

The league concluded on 1 April 2018 with Dublin defeating Galway in the division 1 final. It was their fifth Division 1 title in six years.

Format

League structure
The 2018 National Football League consists of four divisions of eight teams. Each team plays every other team in its division once, usually four home and three away or three home and four away. Two points are awarded for a win and one point for a draw.

Tie-breaker
If only two teams are level on league points -
 The team that won the head-to-head match is ranked first
 If this game was a draw, score difference (total scored minus total conceded in all games) is used to rank the teams
 If score difference is identical, total scored is used to rank the teams
 If still identical, a play-off is required
If three or more teams are level on league points, score difference is used to rank the teams.

Finals, promotions and relegations

Division 1
The top two teams in Division 1 contest the National Football League final. The bottom two teams are relegated to Division 2.

Division 2, Division 3 & Division 4
The top two teams in Divisions 2, 3 and 4 are promoted and contest the finals of their respective divisions. The bottom two teams in Divisions 2 and 3 are relegated.

Division 1

Division 1 table

Division 1 Rounds 1 to 7

Round 1

Round 2

Round 3

Round 4

Round 5

Round 6

Round 7

Division 1 Final

Division 2

Division 2 table

Division 2 Rounds 1 to 7

Round 1

Round 2

Round 3

Round 4

Round 5

Round 6

Round 7

Division 2 Final

Division 3

Division 3 table

Division 3 Rounds 1 to 7

Round 1

Round 2

Round 3

Round 4

Round 5

Round 6

Round 7

Division 3 Final

Division 4

Division 4 table

Division 4 Rounds 1 to 7

Round 1

Round 2

Round 3

Round 4

Round 5

Round 6

Round 7

Division 4 Final

League statistics
All scores correct as of 3 April 2018

Top scorer: Overall

Top Scorer: Single game

Scoring events
Widest winning margin: 14
 Armagh 2-17 – 0-09 Sligo (Division 3)
 Meath 0-21 – 0-07 Clare (Division 2)
 Tipperary 2-17 – 0-09 Louth (Division 2)
Most goals in a match: 8
Cavan 4-12 – 4-16 Roscommon (Division 2 final)
Most points in a match: 35
Dublin 0-20 – 0-15 Donegal (Division 1)
Most goals by one team in a match: 4
Cavan 4-12 – 4-16 Roscommon (Division 2 final)
Meath 4-14 – 1-14 Down (Division 2)
 Highest aggregate score: 52 points
Cavan 4-12 – 4-16 Roscommon (Division 2 final)
Lowest aggregate score: 14 points
Fermanagh 0-07 – 0-07 Armagh (Division 3)

References

External links
 Full Fixtures and Results

 
National Football League
National Football League (Ireland) seasons